Davide Lazzaretti (6 November 1834 – 18 August 1878) was an Italian preacher.

References

Italian religious leaders
Lazzaretti
Lazzaretti